David Ashworth (born 18 July 1944) is an English cricketer. He played seven first-class matches for Oxford University Cricket Club between 1966 and 1967.

See also
 List of Oxford University Cricket Club players

References

External links
 

1944 births
Living people
English cricketers
Oxford University cricketers
People educated at Uppingham School
Alumni of St Edmund Hall, Oxford